Kylemore is a village in the Western Cape of South Africa. It is located in the Cape Winelands, within Helshoogte Pass on the route from Stellenbosch to Franschhoek.

With a population of 4000+ people, the community is largely dependent on employment in the bigger towns, predominantly Stellenbosch, Paarl, and greater Cape Town. The adjacent farms provide seasonal jobs to farm labourers and students during the harvest season.

The town is surrounded by mountains and rivers, with walking trails into the neighboring countryside. Rugby is the most popular sport in the village. After producing two Springboks in Ivan Jacobs and Herschel Jantjies, the local rugby club's numbers rose more than 100%.

References

Populated places in the Stellenbosch Local Municipality